Mary D'Imperio (January 13, 1930 in Germantown, Pennsylvania May 28, 2020 in Springfield, Virginia) was an American cryptographer.

Biography
Mary D'Imperio was born in Germantown, Pennsylvania, January 13, 1930. Her father was the Philadelphia sculptor, Dominic D'Imperio.

D'Imperio received degrees in comparative philology and classics from Radcliffe College from which she graduated magna cum laude, and structural linguistics from the University of Pennsylvania. She was elected a member of Phi Beta Kappa at Radcliffe in 1950.

Between 1960 and 1962, D'Imperio created the TEMAC (Text Macro Compiler) language for processing text. From 1987 to 2006, she was a frequent contributor to North American Breeding Bird Survey reports.

She was introduced to the problem of the Voynich Manuscript by John Tiltman in 1975. She wrote several books and journal articles about the manuscript. These include The Voynich Manuscript: An Elegant Enigma, The Voynich Manuscript: A Scholarly Mystery, and An Application of Cluster Analysis and Multiple Scaling to the Question of "Hands" and "Languages" in the Voynich Manuscript.

According to a 1976 introduction by Vera Filby: "Her career has been with the government since 1951. She was a linguist and cryptanalyst, but thought of herself mainly as a computer programmer".

She died May 28, 2020 in Springfield, Virginia.

Selected works

References 

1930 births
2020 deaths
American cryptographers
National Security Agency cryptographers
University of Pennsylvania alumni
Radcliffe College alumni
Women cryptographers